Mónica Lopera Cossio (born September 10, 1985) is a Colombian-American actress of film, television and theater.

Early life
Lopera was born in Miami, Florida to an American father and Colombian mother. When Monica was 2 years old, her parents took her to Medellín, and when she was 14 they left Medellín to move to Bogotá, Colombia. Her inclination for art began at age 6 when her mother decided to enroll her in a children's theater school. To continue her training and improve her English language, she moved to London, England for 5 years.

Career
In her first soap opera, Francisco el Matemático, she began her evolution as an actress. She has starred in soap operas such as In Eva's Heels and An angel named Blue.

She appeared as Susannah in the 2016 film Between Two Worlds, with Chris Mason.

In 2019, she joined the voice cast of Thomas & Friends as the voice of Gabriela in the UK/US versions, respectively.

Filmography

Film

Television

References

External links

1985 births
American film actresses
American television actresses
American voice actresses
American people of Colombian descent
Colombian film actresses
Colombian television actresses
American expatriates in England
Colombian expatriates in England
Actresses from Florida
People from Miami
21st-century American actresses
Living people
21st-century American women